Perry County is a county located in the southwestern part of the U.S. state of Indiana. As of 2010, the population was 19,338. The county seat is Tell City. The Ohio River Scenic Byway along Indiana State Road 66 runs along the southern border of the county while Interstate 64 traverses the northern portion of the county. Connecting the two is Indiana State Road 37.

The county features three incorporated communities: Tell City (2009 population 7,473), Cannelton (2009 population 1,130) and Troy (2009 population 379). Each is located in Troy Township which is situated along the south western corner of the county.

Coordinated efforts with County officials led to the acquisition of an abandoned rail line that has since been reactivated as the County-owned Hoosier Southern Rail Road. Managed by the Perry County Port Authority, the  short-line rail road connects the Perry County River Port with the Norfolk Southern Rail Road.

Climate and weather

Government

The county government is a constitutional body, and is granted specific powers by the Constitution of Indiana, and by the Indiana Code.

County Council: The county council is the fiscal body of the county government and controls all the spending and revenue collection in the county. Representatives are elected from county districts. The council members serve four-year terms. They are responsible for setting salaries, the annual budget, and special spending. The council also has limited authority to impose local taxes, in the form of an income and property tax that is subject to state level approval, excise taxes, and service taxes.

Board of Commissioners: The executive and legislative body of the county is made of a board of commissioners. The commissioners are elected county-wide, in staggered terms, and each serves a four-year term. One of the commissioners, typically the most senior, serves as president. The commissioners are charged with managing the day-to-day functions of the county government.

Court: The county maintains a small claims court that can handle some civil cases. The judge on the court is elected to a term of six years and must be a member of the Indiana Bar Association. The judge is assisted by a magistrate who is appointed by the judge. In some cases, court decisions can be appealed to the state level circuit court.

County Officials: The county has several other elected offices, including sheriff, coroner, auditor, treasurer, recorder, surveyor, and circuit court clerk Each of these elected officers serves a term of four years and oversees a different part of county government. Members elected to county government positions are required to declare party affiliations and to be residents of the county.

Perry County is part of Indiana's 8th congressional district and is represented in Congress by Republican Larry Bucshon.

Geography

Adjacent counties
 Crawford County (north/ET Border)
 Spencer County (west)
 Dubois County (northwest/ET Border)
 Meade County (southeast/ET Border)
 Breckinridge County, Kentucky (South)
 Hancock County, Kentucky (Southwest)

Major highways
  Interstate 64
  Indiana State Road 37
  Indiana State Road 62
  Indiana State Road 66
  Indiana State Road 70
  Indiana State Road 145
  Indiana State Road 166
  Indiana State Road 545

National protected area
 Hoosier National Forest (part)

Roads and highways
Interstate 64 cuts across the northern portion of the county. State Road 66, designated as the Ohio River Scenic Byway for most of its course in the county, is the most heavily traveled road by residents and visitors alike, adjacent to the three most populous towns in the county as well as most major tourist destinations. State Road 37 connects the county to Bloomington and Indianapolis. Other state roads in the county include State Road 62, which closely parallels I-64; State Road 145, which winds through the western parts of the county; State Road 166, which is little more than a road to and from the hamlet of Tobinsport; State Road 237, which connects Cannelton directly to State Road 37 (also the site of a bridge on the Ohio River); a short run of State Road 545 near Troy; and State Road 70 which connects State Road 37 with State Road 66.

History
Perry County was formed on November 1, 1814 (two years before the state of Indiana was admitted to the Union) from Warrick and Gibson Counties. It was named for Commodore Oliver Hazard Perry who defeated the British squadron in the decisive Battle of Lake Erie in 1813. The Ohio River made Perry County a focal point and settlers were drawn here due to plentiful supplies of natural resources and the area's scenic beauty.

Demographics

As of the 2010 United States Census, there were 19,338 people, 7,476 households, and 5,020 families residing in the county. The racial makeup of the county was 96.0% white, 2.4% black or African American, 0.4% Asian, 0.2% American Indian, 0.3% from other races, and 0.8% from two or more races. Those of Hispanic or Latino origin made up 1.0% of the population. In terms of ancestry, 37.8% were German, 14.4% were Irish, 11.6% were American, and 8.7% were English.

Of the 7,476 households, 30.5% had children under the age of 18 living with them, 52.7% were married couples living together, 9.7% had a female householder with no husband present, 32.9% were non-families, and 28.7% of all households were made up of individuals. The average household size was 2.38 and the average family size was 2.91. The median age was 40.4 years.

The median income for a household in the county was $47,697 and the median income for a family was $55,497. Males had a median income of $42,017 versus $26,301 for females. The per capita income for the county was $20,806. About 6.7% of families and 10.4% of the population were below the poverty line, including 15.9% of those under age 18 and 6.8% of those age 65 or over.

Cities, towns, and unincorporated communities

Cities and towns
 Cannelton
 Tell City
 Troy

Unincorporated communities

 Adyeville
 Apalona
 Bandon
 Branchville
 Bristow
 Celina
 Derby
 Dexter
 Dodd
 Doolittle Mills
 Fosters Ridge
 Gatchel
 Gerald
 Hardingrove
 Kitterman Corners
 Lauer
 Leopold
 Lilly Dale
 Magnet
 Mount Pleasant
 Oriole
 Ranger
 Rome
 Saint Croix
 Sassafras
 Siberia
 Terry
 Tobinsport
 Uniontown

Townships
 Anderson
 Clark
 Leopold
 Oil
 Tobin
 Troy
 Union

See also
 National Register of Historic Places listings in Perry County, Indiana

External links
 Perry County Development Corporation
 Perry County Chamber of Commerce
 Perry County Convention & Visitors Bureau
 Perry County News

References

 
Indiana counties
1814 establishments in Indiana Territory
Populated places established in 1814
Southwestern Indiana
Indiana counties on the Ohio River